Lincoln Park Historic District is a national historic district located at Rocky Mount, Edgecombe County, North Carolina. The district encompasses 47 contributing buildings in a middle-class African-American section of Rocky Mount.  They were built between 1948 and 1953, and include an intact collection of single-family Minimal Traditional-style houses and the Lincoln Park Motel and Restaurant.

It was listed on the National Register of Historic Places in 2012.

References

African-American history of North Carolina
Historic districts on the National Register of Historic Places in North Carolina
Buildings and structures in Edgecombe County, North Carolina
National Register of Historic Places in Edgecombe County, North Carolina